Don Antonio Aguilar y Correa, 8th Marquess of la Vega de Armijo, 6th Marquess of Mos, Grandee of Spain (30 June 1824, in Madrid, Spain – 13 June 1908) was a Spanish noble and politician who served as Prime Minister of Spain between 1906 and 1907, and was appointed three times Minister of State, in governments headed by Práxedes Mateo Sagasta.

Titles
8th Marquess of la Vega de Armijo
6th Marquess of Mos, Grandee of Spain
5th Count of Bobadilla
5th Viscount of Pegullal

Ancestry

References

|-

|-

|-

1824 births
1908 deaths
Marquesses of Spain
Counts of Spain
Prime Ministers of Spain
Foreign ministers of Spain
Presidents of the Congress of Deputies (Spain)
Knights of the Golden Fleece
Grand Croix of the Légion d'honneur
Liberal Party (Spain, 1880) politicians
Grandees of Spain